Valentin Madouas (born 12 July 1996) is a French cyclist, who currently rides for UCI WorldTeam . In May 2019, he was named in the startlist for the 2019 Giro d'Italia. In August 2020, he was named in the startlist for the 2020 Tour de France.

Personal life
His father is Laurent Madouas who was also a professional cyclist, riding from 1989 until 2001.

Major results

2016
 1st Stage 2 Kreiz Breizh Elites
 7th Overall ZLM Tour
2017
 8th Overall Ronde de l'Isard
2018
 1st Paris–Bourges
 2nd Paris–Camembert
 4th Overall Tour du Haut Var
 5th Paris–Tours
 6th Grand Prix d'Isbergues
 7th Overall Four Days of Dunkirk
 7th Grand Prix d'Ouverture La Marseillaise
 8th Overall Route d'Occitanie
1st  Young rider classification
 8th Bretagne Classic
2019
 2nd Classic Sud-Ardèche
 2nd La Drôme Classic
 5th Road race, National Road Championships
 8th Overall Étoile de Bessèges
1st  Young rider classification
 8th Amstel Gold Race
2020
 2nd Grand Prix La Marseillaise
 4th Paris–Tours
 10th Mont Ventoux Dénivelé Challenge
2021
 1st Polynormande
 2nd Boucles de l'Aulne
 2nd Classic Loire Atlantique
 3rd Tour du Jura
 5th Tour du Doubs
 7th Overall Tour des Alpes-Maritimes et du Var
 8th Bretagne Classic
2022
 1st Tour du Doubs
 1st  Mountains classification, Paris–Nice
 3rd Overall Tour de Luxembourg
1st Stages 1 & 5
 3rd Tour of Flanders
 4th Overall Tour du Limousin
1st  Mountains classification
 4th Overall Tour des Alpes-Maritimes et du Var
 7th E3 Saxo Bank Classic
 10th Overall Tour de France
2023
 2nd Strade Bianche
 4th Vuelta a Murcia

Grand Tour general classification results timeline

Classics results timeline

References

External links

1996 births
Living people
French male cyclists
Sportspeople from Brest, France
Cyclists from Brittany